The Winchester Woman is a 1919 American silent crime film directed by Wesley Ruggles and starring Alice Joyce, Percy Marmont, and Robert Middlemass.

Cast
 Alice Joyce as Agatha Winchester 
 Percy Marmont as David Brinton 
 Robert Middlemass as Alan Woodward 
 Jean Armour as Alma Fielder 
 Lucy Fox as Julia Brinton 
 Joseph Burke as Simon Scudder

References

Bibliography
 Donald W. McCaffrey & Christopher P. Jacobs. Guide to the Silent Years of American Cinema. Greenwood Publishing, 1999.

External links

1919 films
1919 crime films
American crime films
Films directed by Wesley Ruggles
American silent feature films
Vitagraph Studios films
American black-and-white films
1910s English-language films
1910s American films